The Asia Cup is an international cricket tournament organised by the Asian Cricket Council.

Asia Cup may also refer to:

 Asia Cup Moot, an international moot court competition
 FIBA Asia Cup, international basketball tournaments run by FIBA Asia
 Men's Hockey Asia Cup, an international men's field hockey tournament run by the Asian Hockey Federation
 Women's Hockey Asia Cup, an international women's field hockey tournament run by the Asian Hockey Federation
 Men's Hockey Junior Asia Cup, an international men's under-21 field hockey tournament run by the Asian Hockey Federation
 Women's Hockey Junior Asia Cup, an international women's under-21 field hockey tournament run by the Asian Hockey Federation
 Women's Asia Cup, an international women's cricket tournament
 Asian TV Cup, Go competition
 Asian Cup (ice hockey)
 Asian Cup Table Tennis Tournament

See also
 AFC Asian Cup, an international association football tournament run by the Asian Football Confederation (AFC)
 AFC Women's Asian Cup, the women's version of the above association football competition